{{DISPLAYTITLE:C6H10O7}}
The molecular formula C6H10O7 (molar mass: 194.14 g/mol, exact mass: 194.0427 u) may refer to:

D-Galacturonic acid
Glucuronic acid
Iduronic acid (IdoA)

Molecular formulas